Frank Coghlan may refer to:

 Frank Coghlan, Jr. (1916–2009), American actor, later a U.S. Navy officer
 Frank Coghlan (footballer) (born 1962), former Australian rules footballer

See also
 Frank Coughlan (1904–1979), Australian jazz musician and band leader